A by-election for the seat of Araluen in the Northern Territory Legislative Assembly was held on 9 October 2010. The by-election was triggered by the resignation of Country Liberal Party (CLP) member Jodeen Carney on 3 September 2010 due to ill health. The seat has been held by the CLP since the seat's creation in 1983. Carney narrowly won the seat in the 2001 general election but built up her margin to receive 68 per cent of the primary vote at the 2008 election.

The CLP preselected Robyn Lambley, a former Deputy Mayor of Alice Springs, while Labor preselected Adam Findlay, a chef. Lambley retained the seat for the Country Liberals, receiving around 68 per cent of the vote.

Results
The Greens, who received 14.6 per cent of the vote at the 2008 election, did not contest this election.

References

2010 elections in Australia
Northern Territory by-elections
2010s in the Northern Territory